The East Tennessee and Georgia Railroad Company was incorporated under special act of Tennessee on February 19, 1836 as the Hiwassee Rail Road Company.

East Tennessee and Georgia Company received a large amount of funds from sale of bonds of the State of Tennessee to aid in rehabilitation of the line after the American Civil War. The State held a statutory lien on the property as security for this debt.

East Tennessee and Georgia Railroad Company was consolidated with East Tennessee and Virginia Railroad Company on November 26, 1869 to form East Tennessee, Virginia and Georgia Railroad Company.

The property eventually became part of Southern Railway Company on July 7, 1894, through its acquisition of the East Tennessee, Virginia and Georgia Railway Company.

See also 

 Confederate railroads in the American Civil War

Notes

References 
 Interstate Commerce Commission. Southern Ry. Co., Volume 37, Interstate Commerce Commission Valuation Reports, November 6, 1931. Washington: United States Government Printing Office, 1932. .

Defunct Tennessee railroads
Defunct Georgia (U.S. state) railroads
Predecessors of the Southern Railway (U.S.)
Railway companies established in 1836
Railway companies disestablished in 1869
5 ft gauge railways in the United States
1836 establishments in the United States